Skit may refer to:

 A short segment in a performance, such as:
 Sketch comedy
 Hip hop skit
 Puppet skit
 Promo (professional wrestling)

 Skit note, parody of a banknote

See also 
 Skete, a monastic community in Eastern Christianity